The Donostia International Physics Center (DIPC) Foundation was established in 1999 in the framework of a collaboration agreement reached  by the Education and Industry Departments of the Basque Government, the University of the Basque Country, the Regional Government of Gipuzkoa, the City of Donostia and the Kutxa savings bank. Iberdrola participated in the venture during 2000-2003. In 2004 Naturcorp Multiservicios joined the project, followed by Telefónica in 2005.

The DIPC was born as an intellectual center aimed at fostering and providing for the development of highest level basic research in material science. Since its early days, the DIPC has been an open institution, bound to the University of the Basque Country, committed to the internationalization of all basic science engaged in the Basque Country related to physics and material science.

External links 
 DIPC website

Basque Country (autonomous community)
University of the Basque Country
Scientific organizations established in 1999
1999 establishments in Spain